I Know You're Married But I've Got Feelings Too is the second full-length album of Canadian-American singer-songwriter Martha Wainwright. It was released in Australia on May 10, 2008, with other countries to follow. The 14-track album features 12 original tracks and cover versions of Pink Floyd's "See Emily Play" and, as a bonus track in some countries, the Eurythmics' "Love Is a Stranger".

The Australian release included a limited edition digipak with additional images and the bonus track. "Comin' Tonight" was released as an iTunes exclusive download in Australia in April 2008.

Track listing
All songs were written by Wainwright, except where noted.
"Bleeding All Over You" – 3:45
"You Cheated Me" – 3:14
"Jesus & Mary" – 3:40
"Comin' Tonight" – 3:17
"Tower Song" – 3:27
"Hearts Club Band" – 4:21
"So Many Friends" – 3:24
"In the Middle of the Night" – 4:44
"The George Song" – 3:35
"Niger River" – 3:52
"Jimi" – 5:24
"See Emily Play" (Syd Barrett) – 2:18
"I Wish I Were" – 4:18
"Love Is a Stranger" (Annie Lennox, David A. Stewart) – 3:40

iTunes bonus track
<li>"Car Song" – 3:06

Personnel
Musicians

 Martha Wainwright – vocals, acoustic guitar, electric guitar, hand claps
 Brad Albetta – electric bass, piano, drum programming, background vocals, hand claps
 Claes Björklund – keyboards
 Jim Campilongo – electric guitar
 Marius de Vries – drum programming
 Bill Dobrow – drums and percussion
 Donald Fagen – synthesizer (7)
 Martin Gerstad – string arrangement
 Cameron Grieder – nylon strings guitar, electric guitar
 Smokey Hormel – electric guitar (6,8)
 Garth Hudson – keyboards, piano
 Tore Johansson – guitar, vocals
 Matt Johnson – drums
 Julia Kent – cello
 Lily Lanken – vocals (9,11), background vocals (12,13)
 Jens Lindgard – bass
 Anna McGarrigle – keyboard synths and background vocals (12)
 Kate McGarrigle – hand claps (2), Wurlitzer (12), backing vocals (12)
 Joe McGinty – synths
 Mark McGowan – trumpet
 Max Mosten – violin
 Rich Pagano – drums
 Dan Reiser – drums
 Flip Runesson – strings
 Chaim Tannenbaum – mandolin
 Martin Terefe – bass, guitar
 Kamila Thompson – background vocals
 Alex Toff – drums
 Pete Townshend – electric guitar (2,4)
 Jeff Trott – bass, electric guitar
 Rufus Wainwright – vocals (9)
 Doug Wieselman – tenor sax, bass clarinet, Indian flute

Production
 Produced by Brad Albetta, Tore Johansson, Kate McGarrigle, Martin Terefe, Jeff Trott
 Mixed by Michael Brauer, Mike Hedges, Tore Johansson, Ger McDonnell
 Engineered by Brad Albetta, David Carlsson, Brian Fulk, Dyre Gormsen, Tim Hatfield, Don Murnaghan, Michel Pepin, Tom Schick, George Tandero
 Additional engineering by Brad Albetta, Brian Fulk, Borza Gomeshi
 Engineering assisted by Iain Hill.
 Recorded at Allaire Studios, The Bubble (Denmark), GULA Studios (Sweden), Kensaltown Recording Studios (London), Mayk Music (Quebec), MonkeyBoy Studios (New York City), Querbes Service (Montreal).
 Mastered by Greg Calbi at Sterling Sound, New York City

Charts

Release history

References

External links
 Album Sampler Page

2008 albums
Albums produced by Tore Johansson
Albums recorded at Kensaltown Studios
MapleMusic Recordings albums
Martha Wainwright albums